The Chinese highland shrew (Sorex excelsus) is a species of shrew in the family Soricidae. It is found in China.

References

Sorex
Taxonomy articles created by Polbot
Taxa named by Glover Morrill Allen
Mammals described in 1923